Butterleaf is a national park in New South Wales, Australia,  north of Sydney.

In the park there is an old forest with huge trees with holes in it, which provide a home for many living creatures. Such as powerful owls, yellow-bellied, and greater gliders.

See also
 Protected areas of New South Wales
 High Conservation Value Old Growth forest

References

National parks of New South Wales
Protected areas established in 1999
1999 establishments in Australia